The Roman Catholic Diocese of Kisii is a diocese located in the city of Kisii in the Ecclesiastical province of Kisumu in Kenya.

History
 May 21, 1960: Established as Diocese of Kisii from the Diocese of Kisumu

Bishops
 Bishops of Kisii (Roman rite)
 Bishop Maurice Michael Otunga (21 May 1960  – 15 Nov 1969), appointed Coadjutor Archbishop of Nairobi;  future Cardinal
 Bishop Tiberius Charles Mugendi (15 Nov 1969  – 17 Dec 1993)
 Bishop Joseph Mairura Okemwa (since 19 Dec 1994)

Other priest of this diocese who became bishop
Joseph Obanyi Sagwe, appointed Bishop of Kakamega in 2014

See also
Roman Catholicism in Kenya
Kenya Conference of Catholic Bishops

Sources
 GCatholic.org
 Catholic Hierarchy

Roman Catholic dioceses in Kenya
Christian organizations established in 1960
Roman Catholic dioceses and prelatures established in the 20th century
1960 establishments in Kenya
Roman Catholic Ecclesiastical Province of Kisumu